Alfred Grady "Rat" Watson (February 10, 1894 – June 15, 1965), sometimes referenced as Rats Watson, was an American football player.  A native of Houston, he played college football at Southwestern (TX) and Texas and professional football as a quarterback for the Toledo Maroons, Kansas City Blues, Hammond Pros, and Buffalo Bisons in the National Football League (NFL). He appeared in 20 NFL games, 12 as a starter, from 1922 to 1927. He also played for the Second Texas Infantry football team in 1916 and with the 36th Division football team during World War I.

References

1894 births
1965 deaths
People from Houston
Players of American football from Texas
Toledo Maroons players
Hammond Pros players
Kansas City Blues (NFL) players
Buffalo Bisons (NFL) players
Texas Longhorns football players